Pantophaea favillacea is a moth of the family Sphingidae. It is known from savanna and bush from eastern Kenya to Tanzania, Zambia, Angola, Zimbabwe and Mozambique.

The length of the forewings is 34–39 mm for males and about 48 mm for females and the wingspan is 69–85 mm. The head and thorax are pale grey. The abdomen is pale grey with a narrow dark dorsal line and a pair of blackish lateral spots on each segment. The forewings are narrow and elongated, pale grey and lightly mottled with darker grey. There are two short narrow black streaks in the centre of the wing, one at the apex. The hindwings are uniformly paler. The body and forewings of the females are darker than in males and the wings are broader and more rounded. The Hindwings are also more rounded and are uniform grey (darker than the forewings).

References

Sphingini
Moths described in 1866
Moths of Africa
Insects of Angola
Fauna of Gabon
Insects of Tanzania